Richard William Burgi (born July 30, 1958) is an American film and television actor best known for the roles of Det. Jim Ellison on The Sentinel and as Karl Mayer on Desperate Housewives. He also portrayed Paul Hornsby in the ABC daytime soap opera General Hospital, and Ashland Locke in the CBS daytime soap opera The Young and the Restless.

Early life
Burgi was born in the suburbs of New York City in Montclair, New Jersey. His family was involved in community theatre. His brother, Chuck Burgi, is a well-known rock drummer who has most recently toured with Billy Joel. After high school, Burgi travelled through the US and Europe, taking odd jobs.

Career
Burgi began his career in New York, which led to regular roles on the Manhattan-based daytime soap operas One Life to Live, Another World and As the World Turns. After moving to Los Angeles, he appeared on the serial, Days of Our Lives. He made a number of guest appearances on episodic television shows, and was also cast in  Chameleons, a TV movie, in 1989. He had a role on Viper, and landed his first lead role in the 1994 television series One West Waikiki.

Burgi was cast as the lead in the series The Sentinel. The show ran for three seasons; its cancellation left key plot issues unresolved, which led to a successful fan campaign for additional episodes to end the story. Burgi went on to roles on The District, 24 and Judging Amy as well as bit parts in other television series and films, including Matlock.  In the 1998 made-for-TV remake of the movie I Married a Monster, Burgi starred as Nick Farrell (the monster).

One of Burgi's most notable roles was on Desperate Housewives as Karl Mayer, the ex-husband of Susan Mayer and father to Julie. Burgi appeared as Karl for several seasons. He also starred in the big-screen thriller Cellular in 2004 as well as a remake of Fun with Dick and Jane and In Her Shoes as Toni Collette's love interest in 2005. In 2007, Burgi was cast in the horror film Hostel: Part II. In 2009, he played the police officer in Friday the 13th and a stylish doctor in Nip/Tuck.Burgi guest-starred as Thomas Wellington in CBS's Harper's Island (2009).

In 2010, Burgi guest-starred in an episode of Law & Order: Special Victims Unit. In 2011, Burgi guest-starred on TV Land's Hot in Cleveland. In 2011, it was announced that he would play Karl Parker in My Family USA, which premiered on September 26, 2011. In 2011, Burgi landed a new recurring role as CIA hitman Clyde Decker, who is part of a government conspiracy targeting the title character in Chuck. In 2011, Burgi appeared in season 9 of One Tree Hill as Brooke Davis's father. In 2012, he starred in cult classic "Christmas Twister" as TV Reporter 1, in which his character was killed trying to parry away a low flying shipping container. In 2013, Burgi guest-starred on Lifetime's Devious Maids as a brother, uncle, and love interest, Henri.

From 2015-2016, Burgi played Paul Hornsby in the ABC daytime serial General Hospital.

In 2021, Soap Opera Digest reported that Burgi had been cast in the recurring role of Ashland Locke on CBS' daytime soap opera, The Young and the Restless, with the character first appearing on March 11, 2021. In 2022, Burgi was fired from Y&R for violating the show's COVID-19 policy, and his role on the show was recast with former Guiding Light'' star Robert Newman.

Personal life
Burgi married Lori Kahn on November 25, 1995. They have two sons: Jack, born December 8, 1996, and Samuel, born August 15, 2000. Burgi married Liliana Lopez in February 2012.

Filmography

Film

Television

Notes

  Season 2
  Seasons 1, 5 & 6
  Seasons 3, 4 & 8
  Season 9

References

External links
 
 
 
 

1958 births
Male actors from New Jersey
American male film actors
American male soap opera actors
American male television actors
Living people
People from Montclair, New Jersey
People from Laguna Beach, California
20th-century American male actors
21st-century American male actors